ICRT may refer to:
 International Community Radio Taipei
 International Consumer Research & Testing
 Instituto Cubano de Radio y Televisión, ie. Cuban Institute of Radio and Television